Judith Suzarra Campbell is an American chef. She is the chef and owner of Sazón Restaurant & Cafe.

Life 
She was born in Puerto La Cruz. She grew up in Caracas. In 2004, she co-founded Sazón Restaurant & Cafe, with Robert Campbell. In 2021, they closed the restaurant.

In 2017, she did a live cooking demonstration for Al Día. She contributed to  Sisterly Love Sunday Supper.

References

External links 

 Jennifer Rodríguez & Chef Judith Suzarra-Campbell Love + Grit

American chefs
People from Puerto la Cruz
American women chefs
Venezuelan emigrants to the United States
Year of birth missing (living people)
Living people